USS Merrimack (AO-179) was the third ship of the Cimarron-class of fleet oilers of the United States Navy. Merrimack was built at the Avondale Shipyards in New Orleans, Louisiana starting in 1978 and was commissioned in 1981 for service in the Atlantic Fleet. Total cost for the ship was $107.1 million. She was last homeported at Norfolk, Virginia. Between 1989 and 1991 Merrimack was "jumboized", meaning that, after cutting the ship into two sections after about a third from the bow, a 35.7 m long section was added to increase the fuel load. Merrimack was decommissioned on 18 December 1998 and struck from the Naval Vessel Register on the same day. Her title was transferred to the Maritime Administration. She was scrapped in Brownsville on 5 June 2013.

References

External links
Navsource

 

1980 ships
Cimarron-class fleet replenishment oilers